Scott Roberts may refer to:

 Scott Roberts (footballer) (born 1996), Scottish footballer
 Scott Roberts (rugby union) (born 1984), rugby union prop forward
 Scott Roberts (voice actor) (born 1978), Canadian voice actor, film actor, and stage actor
 Scott Roberts, director of 2002 Australian crime film The Hard Word